Rang (color) is a Tulu film directed by Suhan Prasad and Vismaya Vinayak starring Arjun Kapikad, Deekshitha Acharya, Devadas Kapikad, Naveen D Padil, Bhojaraj Vamanjoor, Gopinath Bhat. Famous Bollywood comedian Johnny Lever appears in guest role. Rang is produced under the banner of Kateeleshwari Combines.

Plot            
The film is about two friends who join an engineering college in Mangalore. The hero (Arjun Kapikad) has a dark past which troubles him and is suffering from a mental disorder due to this.

Cast

 Arjun Kapikad	
 Deekshitha Acharya		
 Devadas Kapikad	
 Naveen D. Padil	
 Bhojraj Vamanjoor		
 Satish Bandale
Johnny Lever (guest appearance)

Soundtrack
The soundtracks of the film were composed by Manikanth Kadri.

References

External links
 
 http://www.daijiworld.com/news/news_disp.asp?n_id=205367

2014 films